"Fantasy" is the debut single of Canadian pop duo Appleton. It was released on September 2, 2002, and peaked at number two on the UK Singles Chart, held off the top spot by Atomic Kitten's "The Tide Is High (Get the Feeling)".

Background
Between 1993 and 2001, twin sisters Nicole and Natalie Appleton were members of the girl group All Saints. After the band's break-up, the sisters formed the duo Appleton and signed to Polydor Records. Producer Gareth Young sent Appleton a demo of "Fantasy" and they recorded the track at his house.

Music video
The music video was directed by Jason Smith. It is set during a performance in a bar, interspersed with scenes of a couple kissing and later having sex, as well as a barfight which is broken up by security. At the final pre-chorus, Natalie stage dives into the audience; originally Nicole was supposed to do it, but she chickened out at the last moment—with the excuse that they didn't put down the mattress—and her sister had to show her how it was done. Appleton didn't have an idea for the song except that they wanted to do it live and recorded it on the spot.

There is another version of the video with an alternate ending, showing Natalie and Nicole walking down a subway after the gig discussing the fight that broke out.

Track listings

Credits and personnel
 Natalie Appleton – vocals
 Nicole Appleton – vocals
 Andrew Hayman – music, lyrics
 Gareth Young – music, guitar, bass guitar, production
 Matt Exelby – guitar
 Lucy Rowe – backing vocals

Charts

Weekly charts

Year-end charts

Release history

References

2002 debut singles
2002 songs
Appleton (music duo) songs
Polydor Records singles